Saint John River may refer to:

Saint John River (Bay of Fundy), in Canada (mainly New Brunswick but also Quebec) and the United States (Maine)
Saint John River (Liberia), in West Africa

See also
St. Johns River, in Florida, United States
St. John's River (California), in Visalia, California, United States
St. John Rivers, a character in Jane Eyre
Saint-Jean River (disambiguation)